The 2000 Kentucky Wildcats football team represented the University of Kentucky during the 2000 NCAA Division I-A football season.  They participated as members of the Southeastern Conference in the Eastern Division. The team played their home games at Commonwealth Stadium in Lexington, Kentucky.  They were led by head coach Hal Mumme, who was fired after the end of the season.

Roster

Statistics 

Conference Record: 0-8 SEC

Points For: 254

Points/G: 23.1 (77th of 116)

Points Against: 383

Opp Pts/G: 34.8 (106th of 116) 

SRS: -4.97 (81st of 116) 

SOS: 5.12 (17th of 116)

Schedule

References

Kentucky
Kentucky Wildcats football seasons
Kentucky Wildcats football